Soulcage are a heavy metal band formed in Helsinki, Finland in 1999. 

The band plays melodic metal/rock with progressive influences. In 2004 they released their first demo With the Time I Run, followed by their debut album Dead Water Diary in 2006 with limited success, and the follow-up Soul for Sale in April 2009, reaching a wider audience than they had previously. 'My Canvas, My Skin' was released as the debut single from ‘Soul For Sale’, along with a video directed and written by Tuomas Parviainen. Soulcage are currently signed to the independent label Hellas Records.

Soul for Sale was released on 8 April 2009 in Finland, and on 8 May 2009 in Germany, Austria and Switzerland. It is set to be released on 23 April 2010 in the United Kingdom.

Members 
 Aleksi Parviainen - Vocals
 Teppo Parviainen - Guitars
 Markus Hellas - Keyboards
 Jari Ilomäki - Bass
 Ville Siuruainen - Drums

Discography

Albums
Dead Water Diary (September 29, 2006)
Soul for Sale (April 8, 2009)

EP
Beginning (2014)

Demos
With The Time I Run (demo) (2004)

External links 

 
 Soulcage on MySpace
 Soulcage on Last.fm

Musical groups established in 1999
Finnish heavy metal musical groups
1999 establishments in Finland